Vosloo is a surname. 

The Vosloo progenitor (Jan Vosloo) was born around 1649, a grandson of Johan Crantz (1575) from the farm Voßloh(Vossloh) in Westphalia Germany.

Jan Vosloo (1649) joined the VOC in order to escape poverty that gripped Germany after the thirty year war.

Notable people with the surname include

Abraham Vosloo (born 1966), South African politician
Arnold Vosloo, South African-American actor
Gerhard Vosloo (born 1979), South African rugby union player
Jacques Vosloo (born 2001), South African cricketer
Phillip Vosloo (born 1971), South African cricket umpire
Wian Vosloo (born 1995), South African rugby union player

Vosloo Book
Daniel Jacobs at the request of Ton Vosloo compiled a book in two parts to tell the story of the Vosloos.

References